Álvaro Ramos may refer to:

 Álvaro Ramos (footballer) (born 1992), Chilean footballer
 Álvaro Ramos Trigo (born 1950), Uruguayan agronomist and politician